"Tremor" is a song by Dutch DJ and record producer Martin Garrix and Belgian DJ duo Dimitri Vegas & Like Mike. The song was released by Spinnin' Records as the official 2014 anthem for Dutch dance event Sensation. It was released as a digital download on 20 April 2014 on Beatport and on 20 June 2014 on iTunes in the United Kingdom. The song debuted at number 30 on the UK Singles Chart, and also charted in Belgium, France and the Netherlands. It was written by Dimitri Thivaios, Martijn Garritsen and Michael Thivaios.

It is considered one of the most popular big room house songs of all-time, along with "Animals" by Martin Garrix, "Epic" by Sandro Silva and Quintino, "Spaceman" by Hardwell and "Tsunami" by Dvbbs and Borgeous.

Music video
A music video to accompany the release of "Tremor" was first released onto YouTube on 22 April 2014 at a total length of three minutes and nineteen seconds.

Chart performance

Weekly charts

Year-end charts

Release history

References 

2014 singles
2014 songs
Martin Garrix songs
Songs written by Martin Garrix
Electronic dance music songs
Spinnin' Records singles
Dimitri Vegas & Like Mike songs